

Current population

From 2013 census, The City of Banja Luka has a population of 185,042 people.

Ethnic composition

Religious composition

1991 
According to the 1991 census, the municipality of Banja Luka had a population of 195,692, including:

106,826 (54.58%) Serbs 
29,026 (14.83%) Croats
28,558 (14.59%) ethnic Muslims
23,656 (12.08%) ethnic Yugoslavs
7,626 (3.92%) others and unknown

1981 
According to the 1981. census, the municipality of Banja Luka had a population of 183,618, including:

93,389 (50,86%) Serbs
30,442 (16,57%) Croats
21,726 (11,83%) ethnic Muslims
31,347 (17,07%) ethnic Yugoslavs
6,714 (3,65%) others and unknown

1971 
According to the 1971. census, the municipality of Banja Luka had a population of 158,736, including:

92,465 (58,25%) Serbs
33,371 (21,02%) Croats
24,268 (15,28%) ethnic Muslims
4,684 (2,95%) ethnic Yugoslavs
3,948 (2,48%) others and unknown

Settlements (over 1,500 residents), 1991. census 

 Banja Luka

total: 143,079

70,155 (49.03%) Serbs
27,689 (19.35%) ethnic Muslims
15,700 (10.97%) Croats 
22,645 (15.82%) ethnic Yugoslavs
6,890 (4.81%) others and unknown
 Ivanjska

total: 4,577

3,306 (72.23%) Croats
1,095 (23.92%) Serbs
6 (0.13%) ethnic Muslims
118 (2.57%) ethnic Yugoslavs
52 (1.13%) others and unknown
 Piskavica

total: 3,798

3,729 (98.18%) Serbs
15 (0.39%) Croats
1 (0.02%) ethnic Muslims
27 (0.71%) ethnic Yugoslavs
26 (0.68%) others and unknown
 Rekavice

total: 2,679

2,487 (92.83%) Serbs
128 (4.77%) Croats
1 (0.03%) ethnic Muslims
49 (1.82%) ethnic Yugoslavs
14 (0.52%) others and unknown
 Dragočaj

total: 2,578

1,890 (73.31%) Croats
478 (18.54%) Serbs
21 (0.81%) ethnic Muslims
141 (5.46%) ethnic Yugoslavs
48 (1.86%) others and unknown
 Kola

total: 2,241

2,212 (98.70%) Serbs
1 (0.04%) ethnic Muslims
18 (0.80%) ethnic Yugoslavs
10 (0.44%) others and unknown
 Motike

total: 2,009

944 (46.98%) Croats
941 (46.83%) Serbs
10 (0.49%) ethnic Muslims
80 (3.98%) ethnic Yugoslavs
34 (1.69%) others and unknown
 Krupa na Vrbasu

total: 1,858

1,826 - 98.27% Serbs
7 - 0.37% Croats
1 - 0.05% ethnic Muslims
14 - 0.75% ethnic Yugoslavs
10 - 0.53% others and unknown
 Bistrica

total: 1,703

1,651 - 96.94% Serbs
6 - 0.35% ethnic Muslims
3 - 0.17% Croats
32 - 1.87% ethnic Yugoslavs
11 - 0.64% others and unknown
 Bočac

total: 1,685

1,670 - 99.10% Serbs
1 - 0.05% Croats
1 - 0.05% ethnic Muslims
3 - 0.17% ethnic Yugoslavs
10 - 0.59% others and unknown
 Pavlovac

total: 1,522

1,377 - 90.47% Serbs
26 - 1.70% Croats
7 - 0.45% ethnic Muslims
39 - 2.56% ethnic Yugoslavs
73 - 4.79% others and unknown
 Šimići

total: 1,516

1,493 - 98.48% Croats
8 - 0.52% Serbs
15 - 0.98% others and unknown

Historical population 

At the first census, conducted by Austro-Hungarian authorities in 1879, Banja Luka had the following religious (ethnic) composition:

Banja Luka municipality - 86,209 citizens, Orthodox 74.46%, Muslims 14.33%, Catholics 10.52%

Banja Luka city - 13,566 citizens, Muslims 67.71%, 19.8% Orthodox.

As the city was industrialized and wider urbanization of the surrounding areas took place, Orthodox Serbs that typically inhabited surrounding rural areas (due to Ottoman feudal system) were incorporated into the city's urban structure. Bosnian Muslims claim that their drop of percentage in the city's population was partly influenced by the Agrarian Reform of 1918, which ordered major landowners to transfer land to those who tilled it, who in this region were mostly Orthodox Serbs. The Agrarian Reform was introduced as means to dismantle the old Bosnian feudal system. Bosnian Muslims claim that the reform was abused to change the ethnic makeup of the region in the long term. Bosnian Serbs claim that Agrarian Reform was introduced to return the land stolen from the Christian people by the Ottoman Empire. Because the city was in the center of the Bosnian Krajina region, with a predominant Orthodox Serb majority, the Serb population of Banja Luka has steadily increasing.

Banja Luka is the seat of the Roman Catholic Diocese of Banja Luka and home to the Cathedral of St. Bonaventure.

During World War II most of Banja Luka's prominent Serbian and Sephardic Jewish families were deported to nearby Croatian concentration camps, such as Jasenovac and Stara Gradiška in Croatia. Today, Banja Luka's Jewish community is virtually non-existent. A spike in Serbian immigration was mostly noted after the earthquake of 1969, when the city has seen a boom in housing construction.

In 1991 the city of Banja Luka was still an ethnically mixed city (with a relative Serb majority), while on the municipal level there was an evident Serb majority of 54.6%.

References 

 Official results from the book: Ethnic composition of Bosnia-Herzegovina population, by municipalities and settlements, 1991. census, Zavod za statistiku Bosne i Hercegovine - Bilten no.234, Sarajevo 1991.

Banja Luka
 
Banja Luka